Sapolsky or Sapolski is a Polish masculine surname, its feminine counterpart is Sapolska or Sapolskaya. It may refer to
Gabe Sapolsky (born 1972), American professional wrestling promoter 
Robert Sapolsky (born 1957), American neuroendocrinologist and author 

Polish-language surnames